"Judge, Jury and Executioner" is a 2013 single by the rock band Atoms for Peace, a supergroup formed by Radiohead singer Thom Yorke. It is the third single from their debut album, Amok. It was released on iTunes on January 7, 2013 and on 12" vinyl on March 19.

History
Atoms for Peace first performed "Judge, Jury and Executioner" on their US tour in October 2009 and April 2010. It was released as a download on January 7, 2013, after its broadcast on BBC Radio 1. Fans who pre-ordered the album could download the song free. A music video by Tarik Barri was released simultaneously. The limited vinyl version of the single, with an accompanying b-side "S.A.D." was released on March 19, 2013. A live video of the song, recorded at Fuji Rock Festival, was released on the Atoms for Peace website.

The song shares its name with the subtitle of a Radiohead song, "Myxomatosis", released on the 2003 album Hail to the Thief. Yorke said this was accidental, and that he had forgotten he had used the phrase before.

Reception
The song generally met with positive reviews, despite being likened to Yorke's other work. Will Hermes of Rolling Stone gave it 3.5 stars out of 5, praising "Yorke's swarming choral-style" and Flea's basslines, which he described as "a morph between Flea's instrument and Yorke's humming". Daniel Kreps of Spin depicted the earlier version of the song as "a dark, aggressive centerpiece among the post-Eraser material", whereas the final version was "mellower and more harmonious". Kia Makarechi of The Huffington Post wrote that the song, like Atoms for Peace, is "a sonic extension of Radiohead". David Greenwald of Billboard described the song as "a blend of acoustic and electronic instrumentation, with Yorke's voice floating over wordless background vocals and insistent percussion".

Track listing

References

External links

Official website

Songs written by Thom Yorke
Songs written by Flea (musician)
Song recordings produced by Nigel Godrich
2013 singles
2013 songs
XL Recordings singles
Atoms for Peace (band) songs